is a 2006 comedy heist film directed by Japanese director Tetsu Maeda, based on a novel by Kōtaro Isaka.

Plot
The film is about a group of four people who form a gang to put romance back into bank robbery. The film is light-hearted in tone, and makes impressive use of CGI.

Cast
Cast members include: Takao Osawa (as Naruse, boss and "human lie detector"), Kyōka Suzuki (as Yukiko, driver and "human clock"), Shota Matsuda (as Kuon, the pickpocket), Kōichi Satō (as Kyōno, the coffee shop owner), and Koji Okura (as Jimichi).

 Takao Osawa as Naruse
 Kyōka Suzuki as Yukiko
 Shota Matsuda as Kuon
 Kōichi Satō as Kyono
 Arata Furuta as Tanaka
 Ren Ohsugi as Kunimoto
 Suzuki Matsuo as Kamoda
 Ken Mitsuishi as Asakura
 Rosa Kato as Shoko
 Sakichi Sato
 Hoka Kinoshita as Hayashi
 Tomohiro Miura as Shinichi
 Yuichiro Nakayama as Akajima
 Koji Okura as Jimichi
 Eisuke Shinoi as Urushibara
 Ryo Iwamatsu
 Yasuhi Nakamura
 Shou Ohkura
 Takashi Okuda
 Kyisaku Shimada
 Kaori Sunaga
 Ellie Toyota

References

External links
 
  as archived October 30, 2008 at Wayback Machine
 Trailer 

2006 films
2006 comedy films
Japanese heist films
2000s Japanese-language films
2000s Japanese films